At War with Walls & Mazes is the debut studio album by Ryan Lott under the Son Lux moniker. It was released through Anticon on March 11, 2008.

Critical reception
Mehan Jayasuriya of PopMatters gave the album 6 stars out of 10, calling it "a dense, meticulously crafted haze of Baroque instrumentation, electronic pulses and hip-hop beats." Matt Gollock of The Skinny gave the album 4 stars out of 5, saying: "This album's a slow burner that'll take a few repeated plays to really hatch, but it's another in a long line of truly innovative records from a rare gem of a label."

Andy Whitman of Paste named it the 2nd best album of 2008.

Track listing

Personnel
Credits adapted from liner notes.

 Ryan Lott – production, performance, mixing
 Matthew DeRubertis – bass guitar (4, 6)
 Katie Kikel – flute (4)
 Steven Temme – saxophone (5, 6)
 Eric Stephenson – cello (5)
 Judson Crane – string arrangement (5)
 Doc Harrill – mixing
 Mike Wells – mastering
 Joshue Ott – artwork
 Sam Flax Keener – layout

References

External links
 

2008 debut albums
Son Lux albums
Anticon albums